Madison Township is one of ten townships in Daviess County, Indiana. As of the 2010 census, its population was 2,840 and it contained 1,233 housing units.

History
Madison Township was organized in 1823 and given the name of "Wallace Township". The original name was used for twelve years; in 1835, residents supported a petition to change the township's name to "Madison", and the county commissioners granted their request.

Among the township's leading nineteenth-century residents was one Ben Perkins, a mulatto; despite the prevailing sentiments of the time, he was well regarded in the community.  Living at a time when only whites held the franchise, he regularly voted the Whig ticket without being challenged.  In the 1856 spring elections, the Know Nothing movement was popular in Madison Township, and the Democrats nominated Perkins for township clerk; to their surprise, he won, and his actions in office won him the reputation of one of the best clerks the township ever had.  To the even greater surprise of local Democratic leaders, Perkins refused to vote the party line in the presidential election of that autumn, instead supporting John C. Frémont, the Republican candidate.

Geography

Cities and towns
 Odon

Unincorporated towns
 Farlen

Adjacent townships
 Taylor Township, Greene County (northeast)
 Perry Township, Martin County (southeast)
 Van Buren Township (south)
 Bogard Township (southwest)
 Elmore Township (west)
 Cass Township, Greene County (northwest)

Major highways

Cemeteries
The township contains these cemeteries: Ferguson, Friendship, Pleasant Hill and Walnut Hill.

References
 United States Census Bureau cartographic boundary files
 U.S. Board on Geographic Names

External links

 Indiana Township Association
 United Township Association of Indiana

Townships in Daviess County, Indiana
Townships in Indiana
1823 establishments in Indiana
Populated places established in 1823